Teleiodes gangwonensis is a moth of the family Gelechiidae. It is found in central Korea.

The wingspan is 10–10.5 mm. The forewings are pale grey, with a dark-grey basal fascia and a broad, pale brown antemedian band, with a large, triangular costal patch. The median fascia is dark grey and there is an ochreous white patch beyond the median fascia along the costa. Dark fuscous scales are scattered beyond the median fascia. The hindwings are pale grey.

Etymology
The species name refers to Gangwon, the locality.

References

Moths described in 2007
Teleiodes